Cherokee Village is a city in Fulton and Sharp counties in the U.S. state of Arkansas. The population was 4,671 at the 2010 census, with an estimated population of 4,661 in 2019.

Geography
Cherokee Village is located at  (36.293289, -91.572336).

The city limits include seven lakes and two marinas. The largest is Lake Thunderbird with over seven miles of shoreline. The area has become popular with vacation home owners and with those who want to rent a property for a week or two.

Demographics

2020 census

As of the 2020 United States census, there were 4,780 people, 2,370 households, and 1,335 families residing in the city.

2000 census
As of the census of 2000, there were 4,648 people, 2,182 households, and 1,577 families residing in the city. The racial makeup of the city was 97.14% White, 0.17% Black or African American, 0.65% Native American, 0.24% Asian, 0.02% Pacific Islander, 0.11% from other races, and 1.68% from two or more races.  0.62% of the population were Hispanic or Latino of any race.

There were 2,182 households, out of which 16.3% had children under the age of 18 living with them, 63.3% were married couples living together, 6.7% had a female householder with no husband present, and 27.7% were non-families. 24.8% of all households were made up of individuals, and 16.0% had someone living alone who was 65 years of age or older.  The average household size was 2.13 and the average family size was 2.50.

In the city, the population was spread out, with 15.6% under the age of 18, 4.1% from 18 to 24, 15.9% from 25 to 44, 26.2% from 45 to 64, and 38.1% who were 65 years of age or older.  The median age was 58 years. For every 100 females, there were 90.9 males.  For every 100 females age 18 and over, there were 88.7 males.

The median income for a household in the city was $27,997, and the median income for a family was $29,636. Males had a median income of $22,639 versus $18,571 for females. The per capita income for the city was $17,105.  About 9.9% of families and 13.4% of the population were below the poverty line, including 29.2% of those under age 18 and 5.6% of those age 65 or over.

Notable people
 Tommy Bolt, member of the World Golf Hall of Fame
 Garrard Conley, American author

References

External links
 City of Cherokee Village official website
 Cherokee Village in the Encyclopedia of Arkansas History & Culture

Cities in Fulton County, Arkansas
Cities in Sharp County, Arkansas
Cities in Arkansas
Arkansas placenames of Native American origin